Carns State Aid Bridge is a historic bridge that spans the Niobrara River about 10.8 miles northeast of Bassett, Nebraska.  It is a Parker & Pratt through truss bridge built in 1912.  It has also been known as Niobrara River Bridge and denoted as NEHBS No. RO00-72.

It was listed on the National Register of Historic Places in 1992.

References

External links 

More photos of the Carns State Aid Bridge at Wikimedia Commons

Bridges completed in 1912
Buildings and structures in Rock County, Nebraska
Buildings and structures in Keya Paha County, Nebraska
Road bridges on the National Register of Historic Places in Nebraska
1912 establishments in Nebraska
National Register of Historic Places in Keya Paha County, Nebraska
National Register of Historic Places in Rock County, Nebraska
Parker truss bridges in the United States
Pratt truss bridges in the United States